Yuliya Igorevna Aleksandrova (born April 14, 1982) is a Russian actress. She appeared in more than 40 films since 2009.

Biography
Yuliya Aleksandrova was born on April 14, 1982. She studied at Russian Institute of Theatre Arts, after which she began working at the ApARTe theater.

Selected filmography

References

External links 
 Yuliya Aleksandrova on kino-teatr.ru

1982 births
Living people
Actresses from Moscow
Russian film actresses
Russian television actresses
Russian stage actresses
21st-century Russian actresses